In London, England, Blue Line may refer to:
 The Piccadilly Line, coloured dark blue on the London Underground diagram
 The Victoria Line, coloured light blue on the London Underground diagram